John Garvin McMakin (born September 24, 1950) is a former professional American football tight end who played five seasons in the National Football League (NFL) from 1972–1976 for the Pittsburgh Steelers, the Detroit Lions and the Seattle Seahawks. He was a member of the Steelers first World Championship, Super Bowl IX over the Minnesota Vikings.  He was the Steelers' 3rd round draft pick in the 1972 NFL Draft.

McMakin played a role in one of the most famous plays in football history, the Immaculate Reception.  In a 1972 playoff game between the Steelers and Oakland Raiders, the Raiders were leading 7-6 with a few seconds left.  Steelers quarterback Terry Bradshaw threw a pass to John Fuqua that deflected off either Fuqua, Raider safety Jack Tatum or both, and was caught by Steeler running back Franco Harris who ran for the winning touchdown.  The main controversy of the play was whether ball hit Tatum or not; under the rules of the time Harris' catch would have been illegal if it had not.  But another point of controversy was McMakin's block from behind on Raider linebacker Phil Villapiano which helped free Harris for the touchdown.  Villapiano has always maintained that the block was an illegal clip and so even if the catch was legal the touchdown should have been called back.

McMakin's pro career ended when he was waived by the Seahawks prior to the 1977 season after the Seahawks acquired tight end John Sawyer from the Houston Oilers.

References

  

1950 births
American football tight ends
Detroit Lions players
Clemson Tigers football players
Living people
Pittsburgh Steelers players
Seattle Seahawks players
People from Spartanburg, South Carolina